William Dalton was an Irish footballer who played as a forward. He made his Ireland debut aged 18 years and eight days, and went on to win eleven caps for Ireland, scoring four goals, including two on his international debut against Scotland in the 1887-88 British Home Championship. He also played once for the Irish League XI against England in 1894, and also played and scored in an unofficial international against a Canadian touring side.

Dalton and his wife Kathryn later emigrated to Canada, where he died aged 76 in 1946.

References

Irish association footballers (before 1923)
NIFL Premiership players
Linfield F.C. players
Association football forwards
Northern Ireland amateur international footballers
Irish League representative players
Pre-1950 IFA international footballers
1870 births
1946 deaths